Paul Goebel could refer to: 

Paul G. Goebel (1901–1988), American football player and politician
Paul Goebel (television personality) (born 1968), American actor and comedian

See also
Paul Goble (disambiguation)
Paul Joseph Goebbels (1897–1945), Minister of Propaganda of Nazi Germany